Ancyromonas is a genus of basal Eukaryote consisting of heterotrophic flagellates.

It includes the species Ancyromonas sigmoides, first described by Saville Kent in 1880. The genus was rediscovered in modern times by Hänel in 1979. 

They are about 5 μm long and live in both marine and freshwater habitats with a global distribution. 

In 2008, Cavalier-Smith et. al proposed the reassignment of all known species of Ancyromonas into a new genus, Planomonas. Planomonas has since been described as a junior synonym of Ancyromonas. Ancyromonas does not belong to any of the eukaryotic supergroups, and they appear more basal than Malawimonas, placing them in Loukouzoa, possibly relatives of podiates, and depending on the placement of the root position of the Eukaryotes.

References 

Scotokaryotes
Eukaryote genera